The World War I Service Medal was authorized for issue to citizens of Maryland who volunteered for and served in either the Army or Navy of the United States during World War I. The state legislature authorized the medal on April 13, 1922.

Design
Bronze gilt. Marching soldiers with rifles at shoulder arms, framed in a portal with a slightly arched roof containing an outline of the state of Maryland, over which appears the word "Maryland." Reverse "For Service to State & Nation in the World War 1917-1919." Ribbon six white and five red alternating stripes.

1922 establishments in Maryland
Awards established in 1922
Military awards and decorations of World War I
Military in Maryland
State awards and decorations of the United States
United States service medals